Jay D'Souza (born 1 March 1995) is an Indian actor who has appeared in Tamil, Kannada and Telugu television serials. He began his career with the Kannada film Raaga in 2017, which gave him popularity among Kannada audience. He is also known for acting in the Tamil TV serial Sippikkul Muthu which aired on Star Vijay.

Personal life
Jay was born on 1 March 1995 in Karwar, Karnataka, India. He is a Catholic.

Career
Jay appeared in the Kannada film Raaga which was released in 2017, he played a crucial role in the film alongside actors Mithra and Bhama. After his appearance in the film he was highly credited and praised for his acting techniques in the film. He later acted in popular Kannada TV serials such as Akashadeepa and Kalyani. Jya later debuted in Telugu through the serial  Pavithra Bandanam playing the lead male role in the serial. He later debuted in Tamil through the serial Sippikkul Muthu which aired on Star Vijay playing the character of a deaf man.

In 2017, Jay was expected to enter the reality show Bigg Boss Kannada (season 7), however he later last minute opted out from the show before the grand premiere and denied entering the show due to personal issues.

Filmography

Films

Television

References

External links
 

1995 births
Living people
Kannada male actors
Telugu male actors
Tamil male actors
Tamil male television actors
Television personalities from Karnataka
Male actors from Karnataka
Male actors in Kannada cinema
21st-century Tamil male actors